Rottneros is a locality situated in Sunne Municipality, Värmland County, Sweden with 448 inhabitants in 2010. Rottneros means "roaring river mouth" in old Swedish. The river Rottnan used to have three waterfalls close to the discharge into lake Fryken. The waterfalls were built in 1927 for hydroelectric power.

References 

Populated places in Värmland County
Populated places in Sunne Municipality